Erbessa labana is a moth of the family Notodontidae first described by Herbert Druce in 1895. It is found in Venezuela, Ecuador, Peru and Brazil.

References

Moths described in 1895
Notodontidae of South America